Rezerva generală a aviației (RGA) or the General Aviation Reserve in English was a Romanian aircraft factory founded during the First World War. It operated between 1916 and 1919 in Iași. After the war it was transferred to Bucharest and renamed to Arsenalul Aeronautic. The maintenance, repair, and assembly of the aircraft and aircraft engines received by Romania during the war took place here.

History
On 27 September 1916, the workshops of the Flight School from Băneasa and Cotroceni were moved to Iași. The RGA was established in the former slaughterhouse with the material base formed by the materials evacuated from Cotroceni and Băneasa, and with requisitioned tools and machine tools. In the spring of 1917, the organization of the Romanian military aviation also included the RGA, as being subordinated to the Aeronautical Directorate of the Romanian Army's .

During its activity, the RGA assembled and repaired a number of 242 - 292 aircraft and 545 engines. The planes sent by France with General Berthelot's military mission were also assembled in the RGA workshops. 

The aircraft received by Romania arrived at the ports of Arkhangelsk and Murmansk, and were then transported by train to Odessa before reaching Romania. Due to the long journey through Russia, a lot of airplanes arrived with severely damaged parts, thus leaving it up to the engineers and designers from RGA to manufacture new ones. Engineer Constantin Silișteanu and Lieutenant Petre Macavei took part in the management of the RGA.

The activity of the RGA ended in November 1919 when the material and the majority of the personnel were transferred to Bucharest on the field of Cotroceni. On 1 July 1920, it was renamed to Arsenalul Aeronautic.

List of assembled aircraft

The workshops of RGA assembled the following airplanes:

See also
Arsenalul Aeronautic
Romanian Air Corps
List of aircraft of the Romanian Air Force

References

Notes

Bibliography

Aviation in Romania